Little grey or little gray may refer to:

Animals
Little grey flycatcher, a bird species
Little grey greenbul, a bird species
The little gray kiwi or little spotted kiwi, Apteryx owenii is a small New Zealand bird
Little gray rattlesnake, Sistrurus catenatus is a venomous pitviper species of snake
Little grey woodpecker, a bird species
Little grey bird, a birding term for an undistinguished bird

Other uses
The Little Grey Men, a children's book by Denys Watkins-Pitchford
Ferguson TE20, a tractor model commonly known as Little Grey Fergie
Lexie Grey, nicknamed Little Grey, a television character on Grey's Anatomy
Little Grey River, or the Māwheraiti, a river of the West Coast Region of New Zealand

Animal common name disambiguation pages